Grażyna Alicja Tyszko (born 25 April 1949 in Pabianice) is a Polish politician. She was elected to the Sejm on 25 September 2005, receiving 10981 votes in 11 Sieradz district as a candidate in the Samoobrona Rzeczpospolitej Polskiej list.

See also
Members of Polish Sejm 2005-2007

External links
Grażyna Tyszko - parliamentary page - includes declarations of interest, voting record, and transcripts of speeches.

1949 births
Living people
People from Pabianice County
Members of the Polish Sejm 2005–2007
Women members of the Sejm of the Republic of Poland
Self-Defence of the Republic of Poland politicians
21st-century Polish women politicians